Ekaterina Zhuravskaya is Professor of Economics at the Paris School of Economics and EHESS and a Research Fellow of the Centre for Economic Policy Research in the Public Policy and Development Economics programs. She was formerly the academic director of the Center for Economic and Financial Research at the New Economic School in Moscow.  She was the 2018 recipient of the Birgit Grodal At New Economic School she held various professorships. She was given a biennial award as a "a European-based female economist who has made a significant contribution to the Economics profession." In 2021 she was named a Fellow of the Econometric Society.

Additionally, Ekaterina was a member of the Institute for Advanced Study in Princeton, NJ. The Institute is a think-tank type independent research organization which has supported various economic scholars in the past in their research. In the past she has held roles at Columbia University where she was involved in the Initiative for Policy Dialogue, at the University of Michigan's William Davidson Institute where she was a research affiliate, and has a tax consultant at HIID. She also worked on the Russia Transition Project at HIID and a Banking Crisis Project at the Russian Privatization Center in Moscow.

Ekaterina currently holds various roles in academia. She is Director of Studies at School for Advanced Studies in the Social Sciences -- a role which she has held since 2010. She is also an associate member and an associate chairwomen at Paris School of Economics -- since 2010 and 2013, respectively. As noted above, she is also a Research Fellow at Centre for Economic Policy Research in London, UK. At Centre for Economic Policy Research she focuses on public economics and development economics. She is also the co-editor in Co-editor in chief of the Economic Journal (since 2019) and was Associate editor of the Journal of Public Economics (2008-2018)and Associate editor of the Journal of Comparative Economics (2007-2017).  

Her research focuses on empirical political economics and the economics of the media.  In recent years, she has studied factors that make ethnic diversity important for conflict and economic development, including the impact of forced mass movements of ethnic groups in Eastern Europe and from Eastern Europe to Central Asia during WWII, the impact of ethnic occupational segregation on ethnic tensions in the context of historical anti-Jewish violence in Europe, and the impact of political manipulation on ethnic conflict in Central Asia. She has taught courses such as Advanced topics in empirical political economy and development, Introduction to political economy, Development economy, a research seminar "Themes in history and economic development", and Behavioral finance.  She has also published research in an array of different microeconomic and macroeconomic disciplines. Here is a short list from her CV: Fiscal Federalism, arbitrage in the stock market, tax arrears in Russia concerning liquidity and federal redistribution, entrepreneurs in Russia, religions in Russia, Chinese entrepreneurs, bias in Russian commercial courts, decentralization and political institutions, revision to privatization in socialist regimes, the media and political persuasion, forced migration, and the effects of social media on politics,

Academic and professional awards 

 CNRS Silver Medal, 2019
 The Birgit Grodal Prize, EEA, 2018 (awarded every two years to a female European economist having made a significant contribution in the discipline)
 The Montias Prize for the best article published in the Journal of Comparative Economics in two years, 2014–2015
 Consolidator Grant from the European Research Council (ERC) (1.6 million euros for 5 years), to from november 2015
 The Grand Prize of the Russian National Prize for the best research in applied economics, 2016
 Diploma of the Russian National Prize for Best Research in Applied Economics, 2016
 Diploma of the Russian National Prize for the best research in applied economics, 2014
 The “Excellence in Refereeing” Award, American Economic Review, 2011
 W. Leontief International Medal "Contribution to Economic Reforms", awarded in 2010
 Professor of the year at the New Economic School (Moscow), awarded by the alumni association students for the academic year 2009–2010
 Diploma of the National Prize of Russia for the Best Research in Applied Economics, 2010
 The first prize (gold medal) in the GDN medal competition for development researchment, 2006
 Best Economist Award, Russian Academy of Sciences, 2002 and 2003
 World leader for tomorrow, World Economic Forum, Davos, 2001–2004
 The Zvi Griliches Award of Excellence for Research in Economics, Economic Education and Research Consortium, 2000
 The Prize of the Competition for young university economists of the Fifth Nobel eco-symposium, "Economics of Transition", 1999
 “Hans Rausing Professorship” funded by the Lisbet Rausing Foundation, 1998–2009
 Nemchinov Merit Fellowship, Moscow State University, 1990–1993
 Gold Medal of Distinction upon Graduation from High School, 1989

Selected works

References 

Russian women economists
French women economists
Economists from Moscow
Political economists
Economic historians
21st-century Russian economists
Living people
Moscow State University alumni
Alumni of the London School of Economics
Harvard University alumni
1972 births
Women political scientists
Fellows of the Econometric Society